Thomas Storm (September 8, 1748 – August 4, 1833) was an American Revolutionary war officer and state legislator, rising to Speaker of the New York State Assembly in 1802.

Early life
Thomas was born in Hopewell, Dutchess County, New York on September 8, 1748. He was the eldest son of Maria (née van Sickels) Storm and Garrit Storm, for whom the hamlet of Stormville in East Fishkill is named.  Among his siblings was younger brother was John Storm, who married Susanna Brinckerhoff.

Career
Between 1775 and 1777, he was a Captain in the 2nd Dutchess County Militia, and served in the Battle of White Plains. When the regiment was disbanded in 1777, Thomas was assigned to the 2nd New York Regiment, and served at the Battle of Monmouth, and later at the Battle of Yorktown. He served under Col. Van Rensselaer's Regiment and in Col. Jeremiah Hogeboom's Regiment in 1770.

In 1776 and 1777, he as a member of the Committee of Safety. Thomas became a member of the New York State Assembly, from Dutchess County in 1781 to 1784, and from New York County in 1798 and 1803.  He unanimously elected Speaker of the New York State Assembly as a Democratic-Republican in 1802 and 1803.

In 1807, Thomas ran for Lieutenant Governor of New York on the ticket with the incumbent Governor Morgan Lewis, but lost to the incumbent Lieutenant Governor John Broome. Storm was also a member of The New York Society Library.

Personal life
On March 23, 1771, he married Elizabeth Graham (1752–1832), a daughter of the Rev. Chauncey Graham and Elizabeth (née van Wyck) Graham. The wedding took place shortly after the death of his paternal grandfather, who was known as the pioneer Thomas Storm, and his father Garrit gifted the couple a house at the "corner of Madam Brett's Road and the crossroad to the future Stormville," which is today known as the Storm–Adriance–Brinckerhoff House. Together, they were the parents of:

 Elizabeth Storm (1771–1851), who married James Manning, a relative of James Manning, the first president of Brown University.
 Gerrit Storm (1774–1776), who died young.
 John Storm (1776–1794), who died unmarried in St. Domingo.
 Gerrit Storm (1778–1851), who married Susan Matilda Gouverneur (1779–1835) in 1807. Susan, a daughter of Isaac Gouverneur, was the widow of Saumuel Murgatroyd.
 Mary Storm (1779–1845), who married Henry J. Bleecker. After his death, she married John King (–1819).
 Thomas Hall Storm (b. 1781), who died unmarried in the interior of South America.
 Anne Storm (b. 1783), who married Peter Kuhn of Philadelphia, an associate of her brother Thomas. They divorced and she married Jonathan Robinson, a son of U.S. Senator Jonathan Robinson.
 Hester Storm (b. –1832), who married Charles F. Bunner of Philadelphia.
 Catherine Storm (b. ), who married Ruggles Hubbard.
 Stephen Storm (1788–1862), who married his cousin Jane Maria Graham (1790–1874).

His wife died on July 7, 1832. He died on August 4, 1833 in New York City. He is buried at Trinity Churchyard in New York City.

Descendants
Through his eldest daughter Elizabeth, he was a grandfather of Catharine Currie Manning (1809–1886), who married Morgan Lewis Livingston, himself the eldest of twelve children born to Maturin Livingston, a former Recorder of New York City.

Through his son Gerrit, he was a grandfather of Louise Matilda Storm (1810–1883), who married Robert James Livingston, also a son of Maturin Livingston, in 1833.

References

External links

Members of the New York State Assembly
Speakers of the New York State Assembly
1748 births
1833 deaths
People from Hopewell Junction, New York
Politicians from New York City